Mariam Hernández (Fuerteventura, Las Palmas, April 25, 1981) is a Spanish actress.

Biography 
In 1999, aged 18 years, she left Fuerteventura to move to Madrid to study audiovisual communication.

She worked in the series Cuestión de sexo, playing Paloma, Elena's sister (Carmen Ruiz). In this series, she participates with Alejandro Tous, who plays Mario in the series, and Elena's gynecologist. After three seasons, the series was cancelled due to low ratings.

Previously, she worked in the series La tira  as a cashier in a supermarket. She attended cashier number 01, along with "La Yoli" (Esther Rivas) and Manolo (Diego Paris).

From November 2012 to February 2013, she played Daniela Marcos in Fenómenos on Antena 3.

From 2014 to 2016, she played Nieves in Gym Tony on Cuatro. She currently plays Henar Pacheco in Amar es para siempre on Antena 3.

In 2019, the film ¿Qué te juegas?, will be released, in which she shares the lead role with Amaia Salamanca and Javier Rey, among others.

She announces her pregnancy with her first child in the summer of 2019.

Filmography

Television

Awards and nominations 
2012

 Winner of the Best Actress Award at the IX Comedy Film Festival of Tarazona and Moncayo "Paco Martínez Soria" for Curvas.
 Winner of the Best Actress Award at the Dieciminuti Film Festival in Italy for Curvas.
 Nominated for Best Actress at the International Short Film Festival of Valencia "Cortos en off" for Curvas.
 Nominated as Best Actress at the V Festival de Cortos Villamayor de Cine for Curvas.
 Nominated as Best Actress at the Houston Comedy Film Festival for Push Up.

2014

 Nominated for Best Actress at the Flager Film Festival for Runner (Florida, USA).
 Nominated for Best Actress at the Houston Comedy Film Festival for Runner.
 Nominated as Newcomer Actress at the Goya Festival (appearing in the first list of 50 selected).

2019

 Winner of the Best Acting Award at the Castilla y León International Film Festival for her role in the short film Amandine.

References 

Spanish stage actresses
Spanish television actresses
Spanish film actresses
21st-century Spanish actresses
Living people
1981 births